The 1949 New York state election was held on November 8, 1949, to elect a judge of the New York Court of Appeals and a U.S. Senator.

Background
On November 18, 1948, Thomas D. Thacher resigned from the New York Court of Appeals. On January 14, 1949, Bruce Bromley was appointed by Governor Thomas E. Dewey to fill the vacancy temporarily.

On June 28, 1949, Robert F. Wagner resigned from the U.S. Senate, due to ill health. On July 7, John Foster Dulles was appointed by Governor Dewey to fill the vacancy temporarily.

Nominations
The Republican State Committee nominated the incumbents Dulles and Bromley to succeed themselves.

The Democratic State Committee nominated Ex-Governor Herbert H. Lehman (in office 1933-1942) for the U.S. Senate and Supreme Court Justice Charles W. Froessel for the Court of Appeals.

The Liberal Party endorsed the Democratic nominees Lehman and Froessel.

The American Labor Party made no nominations and urged its members not to vote for any candidate.

Result
The Democratic/Liberal ticket was elected. The incumbents Dulles and Bromley were defeated.

Notes

Sources
Official result: THE OFFICIAL COUNT: LEHMAN BY 198,057 in NYT on December 15, 1949 (subscription required)

See also
New York state elections
 United States Senate elections, 1948 and 1949
New York City mayoral election, 1949
 United States Senate elections, 1948 and 1949 

 
1949
New York